Woodland Sketches is a ballet made by Robert La Fosse to Edward MacDowell's eponymous music from 1896 for New York City Ballet's American Music Festival. The premiere took place on Thursday, May 5, 1988, at New York State Theater, Lincoln Center.

Original cast 
 
Valentina Kozlova
Stephanie Saland
Stacy Caddell
Darci Kistler
Leonid Kozlov
Cornel Crabtree
Kipling Houston
Lindsay Fischer

Reviews 
NY Times review by Anna Kisselgoff, May 7, 1988
NY Times review by Bernard Holland, May 9, 1988
NY Times review by Anna Kisselgoff, May 22, 1988

References 

New York City Ballet repertory
New York City Ballet American Music Festival
1988 ballet premieres
Ballets to the music of Edward MacDowell
Ballets by Robert La Fosse